Unrest is the debut solo album from Kings of Convenience and The Whitest Boy Alive singer Erlend Øye, released by the record label Astralwerks in 2003. Each track on the record was recorded in a different city.

Track listing

Music video
 "Sudden Rush", directed by Jarvis Cocker

Charts

References

2003 debut albums
Concept albums
Erlend Øye albums